Birmingham station may refer to:

United Kingdom
Birmingham New Street railway station
Birmingham Snow Hill railway station
Birmingham Moor Street railway station
Birmingham International railway station
Birmingham Coach Station, a coach station in Digbeth, Birmingham, England
Birmingham Curzon Street railway station (1838-1966) (closed), originally known as "Birmingham"
Birmingham Curzon Street railway station, proposed High Speed 2 station
Railway stations in Birmingham city centre

United States
Birmingham station (Alabama), a train station in Birmingham, Alabama serving Amtrak
Birmingham station (Michigan), a former train station in Birmingham, Michigan serving Amtrak
Birmingham Terminal Station, a former train station in Birmingham, Alabama